Artomyces is a genus of coral fungi in the family Auriscalpiaceae. It was circumscribed by Walter Jülich in 1982, who set Artomyces pyxidatus (formerly Clavaria pyxidata Pers. 1794) as the type species.

Species
Artomyces adrienneae Lickey 2003 – Chile, Argentina
Artomyces austropiperatus Lickey 2003 – Argentina
Artomyces candelabrus (Massee) Jülich 1982
Artomyces carolinensis Lickey 2003 – North Carolina
Artomyces colensoi (Berk.) Jülich 1982 – Australia, New Zealand
Artomyces costaricensis Lickey 2003 – Costa Rica
Artomyces cristatus (Kauffman) Jülich 1982
Artomyces dichotomus (Corner) Jülich 1982
Artomyces microsporus (Qiu X.Wu & R.H.Petersen) Lickey 2003
Artomyces nothofagi M.E.Sm. & Kneal 2015– Chile
Artomyces novae-zelandiae Lickey 2003 – New Zealand
Artomyces piperatus (Kauffman) Jülich 1982
Artomyces pyxidatus (Pers.) Jülich 1982
Artomyces stephenii Lickey 2003 – Costa Rica
Artomyces tasmaniensis Lickey 2003 – Tasmania
Artomyces turgidus (Lév.) Jülich 1982

References

Russulales
Russulales genera
Taxa named by Walter Jülich
Taxa described in 1982